The 2016 Fordham Rams football team represented Fordham University in the 2016 NCAA Division I FCS football season. They were led by first-year head coach Andrew Breiner and played their home games at Coffey Field. They were a member of the Patriot League. They finished the season 8–3, 5–1 in Patriot League play to finish in second place.

Schedule

Source: Schedule

Game summaries

at Navy

Elizabeth City State

Penn

at Monmouth

Lafayette

Yale

Georgetown

at Lehigh

Colgate

vs. Holy Cross

at Bucknell

Ranking movements

References

Fordham
Fordham Rams football seasons
Fordham Rams football